The comb-toed jerboa (Paradipus ctenodactylus) is a species of rodent in the family Dipodidae. It is monotypic within the genus Paradipus. It is found in Kazakhstan, Turkmenistan, and Uzbekistan.

References

Dipodidae
Mammals described in 1929
Taxonomy articles created by Polbot